This is a list of works by American actor and musician David Hasselhoff.

Discography 

David Hasselhoff released fifteen studio albums and twelve compilation albums. In 1983, Hasselhoff released his debut single, "I Get The Message", which couldn't enter the charts. In January 1985, he released his debut studio album, Night Rocker, which peaked at number one in Austria, and was certified Platinum there; it also reached the top-thirty in Germany. The album includes "Our First Night Together", a duet with his then-wife Catherine Hickland, which peaked at number 14 in Switzerland. His second album, Lovin' Feelings, was released in 1987, which reached the top-twenty in Austria and Germany, and was certified Gold in the former country.

In 1988, Hasselhoff released the song "Looking for Freedom", which became his biggest international hit of his career, peaking at number one in Austria, Germany and Switzerland. It also reached number four on the European Hot 100 Singles chart; the top-twenty in France and Belgium; and the top-forty in the Netherlands. The song was certified Platinum in Germany, and later became the best-performing single of 1989 in Germany and Switzerland. On June 21, 1989, Hasselhoff released his third studio album of the same name, which also includes the singles "Is Everybody Happy", which reached the top-ten in Germany and Switzerland; and "Flying on the Wings of Tenderness", which peaked at number 22 in Germany. The album was a commercial success, peaking inside the top-five in Austria, Germany and Switzerland. His first compilation album, Knight Lover, was released later that year, and met with moderate success, peaking at numbers 17 and 32 in Switzerland and Germany, respectively.

In August 1990, Hasselhoff released his fourth studio album, Crazy for You, which became his best-selling album of his career, peaking at number one in Austria and Switzerland, and also reaching the top-ten in Germany. The album was another commercial success, being certified triple-Platinum in Switzerland, double-Platinum in Austria, and Platinum in Germany. The album's title track peaked at number four in Austria, and reached the top-twenty in Germany, and the top-thirty in Switzerland. However, the second single, "Freedom for the World", met with moderate success, peaking at numbers 30 and 48 in Austria and Germany, respectively. In September 1991, Hasselhoff released his fifth studio album, David, which continued his success in Europe, being Hasselhoff's third number-one album in Austria (where it was certified double-Platinum), and also being another top-ten album in Germany and Switzerland (where it was certified Platinum in both countries). The lead single, "Do The Limbo Dance", became Hasselhoff's second number-one single in Austria (where it was certified Gold), and also did well in Germany and Switzerland, reaching the top-twenty in both countries. The following singles were another hits in Austria: "Gipsy Girl" (peaked at number 12) and "Hands Up for Rock 'n' Roll" (peaked at number 30). His second compilation For You was released later that year, but failed to chart.

In September 1992, Hasselhoff's sixth studio album Everybody Sunshine was released. Though it was certified Gold in Austria, Germany and Switzerland, it failed to reach the commercial heights of his previous albums. The album's title track reached the top-thirty in Austria and Switzerland; however, the second single, "The Girl Forever" only peaked at number 78 in Germany. In November 1993, Hasselhoff released his seventh studio album You Are Everything, which performed slightly better than its predecessor, but became a moderate commercial success. The album was certified Gold in Austria (where it reached the top-ten) and Switzerland; and includes the songs "If I Could Only Say Goodbye", which became his first song to enter the UK Singles chart, peaking at number 35; and "Wir zwei allein" which became a top-ten hit in Austria (which was certified Gold there), Germany and Switzerland. A third compilation album, Crazy for You was released later that year, but failed to chart. In October 1994, Hasselhoff released his eighth studio album Du, which became a commercial disappointment, being his first album not to receive any certification in Europe, and performing moderately in Austria, Germany and Switzerland. The singles from Du –"Summer of Love" and the title track– failed to chart worldwide. In 1995, Hasselhoff released four compilation albums: the first one, his self-titled album, was released in the United States, and became his first release there since Lovin' Feelings in 1987. As an attempt to launch his singing career in the US, both the album and the single to promote it, "Fallin' in Love" became very unsuccessful and didn't enter any Billboard single or album chart. Other compilations includes Watch Out for the Bay, Is Everybody Happy and Looking for... the Best (which peaked at number 50 in Austria).

As departing with Ariola Records and BMG Music, Hasselhoff signed with Polydor Records and released his ninth studio album, Hooked on a Feeling in November 1997. Though the album's title track peaked inside the top-forty in Austria, the album was very unsuccessful, becoming his first album that failed to chart in Germany, but it did well in Czech Republic (where it peaked at number 11). In Austria and Switzerland, sales were moderate, and became his lowest-selling album to that point of his career. Subsequent compilation albums were released, including Watch Out for Hasselhoff, The Very Best Of and Greatest Hits, which all of them failed to chart. In August 2004, Hasselhoff signed with Edel Records and released his tenth studio album David Hasselhoff Sings America, which performed better in Europe, peaking at numbers 11 and 27 in Austria and Germany, respectively. The Night Before Christmas, his eleventh studio album (and his first Christmas album) was released later that year in November, but received negative reviews and became his first album that failed to chart worldwide. In 2006, Hasselhoff released a cover of "Jump in My Car", which became his highest-charting single in the UK, debuting at number three. It became his first song to chart in Scotland (at number two), Ireland (at number 24) and Australia (at number 50). In 2011, Hasselhoff released his twelfth studio album A Real Good Feeling, which became a success in Austria and peaked at number three. However, his thirteenth studio album This Time Around failed to chart worldwide.

In 2015, Hasselhoff released the song "True Survivor", which became his first entry on the Canadian Hot 100, peaking at number 94. Four years later, he released his fourteenth studio album, Open Your Eyes in September 2019, which charted moderately in Austria, Germany and Switzerland. His fifteenth studio album Party Your Hasselhoff was released on September 3, 2021, and became Hasselhoff's highest-charting album in Germany, debuting at number four and including the Neil Diamond Song Sweet Caroline.

Studio albums

Compilation albums

Singles

Filmography

Film

Television and internet

Video games

Other

Producing credits 

 1989: W.B. Blue and Bean
 1990: DH Live and Forever
 1998: Baywatch: White Thunder at Glacier Bay
 1991–2001: Baywatch: EP
 2003: Baywatch: Hawaiian Wedding
 2010: The Hasselhoffs
 2015: Killing Hasselhoff

Writing credits 

 1995–97: Baywatch
 2015: Hoff The Record

 2019: Up Against the Wall, (Audiobook), publisher: Audible Original,

Stage work 

 Chicago (London) – Billy Flynn
 Jekyll & Hyde (Broadway) – Dr. Henry Jekyll/Edward Hyde
 Grease – Danny Zuko
 Jesus Christ Superstar – Judas Iscariot
 The Producers (Las Vegas) – Roger DeBris
 The Rocky Horror Show (Los Angeles) – Dr. Frank N. Furter
 Peter Pan (London) – Captain Hook (2010–11)
 Peter Pan (Bristol) – Captain Hook (2011–12)
 Peter Pan (Manchester) – Captain Hook (2012–13)
 Peter Pan (Nottingham) – Captain Hook (2013–14)
 Peter Pan (Southend) – Captain Hook (2014–15)
 Peter Pan (Glasgow) – Captain Hook (2015–16)
 Last Night a DJ Saved My Life (UK Tour) – Ross (2015–16)
 Peter Pan (Cardiff) – Captain Hook (2016–17)
 9 to 5 The Musical (Savoy Theatre, London) – Franklin Hart Jnr (2019–20)

Notes

References

External links 
 
 
 

Discographies of American artists
Pop music discographies
Works